Sir Andrew Francis Goddard  (born 8 November 1967 in Plymouth, Devon) is a British doctor. He is a gastroenterology consultant and was the president of the Royal College of Physicians of London between 2018 and 2022.

Goddard was educated at the City of London Freemen's School and  St John's College, Cambridge. He trained in Cambridge, Norwich, Bury St. Edmunds and later Nottingham and has been a gastroenterology consultant at the Royal Derby Hospital since 2002. He was the Registrar of the RCP from 2014 to 2018 and was the head of the RCP's Medical Workforce Unit between 2009 and 2014. In 2018 he was elected to succeed Jane Dacre as college president; his presidency commenced on 26 September 2018.

Goddard was knighted in the 2022 Birthday Honours for services to health and social care. He ended his term in September 2022 and was succeeded by cardiologist Sarah Clarke. Geriatrician David Oliver had won the April election to succeed Goddard but chose to withdraw from the presidency in July for personal reasons.

Personal life
Goddard is married. He has 2 children named Anna and Ben

.

References

Living people
British gastroenterologists
21st-century British medical doctors
Fellows of the Royal College of Physicians
Presidents of the Royal College of Physicians
1967 births
Medical doctors from Plymouth, Devon
People educated at City of London Freemen's School
Alumni of St John's College, Cambridge
Knights Bachelor